PS Stanley was a paddle steamer passenger vessel operated by the London and North Western Railway from 1864 to 1888.

History

She was built by Caird & Company of Greenock and launched in 1864.

All on board were rescued. She as on a voyage from Holyhead to Dublin. She was sold to the Irish National Steamboat Company in August 1888, and in 1890 passed to A. A. Laird and Company. She was broken up shortly afterwards.

References

1864 ships
Passenger ships of the United Kingdom
Steamships
Ships built on the River Clyde
Ships of the London and North Western Railway
Paddle steamers of the United Kingdom
Maritime incidents in February 1877